Januszewo may refer to the following places:
Januszewo, Kościan County in Greater Poland Voivodeship (west-central Poland)
Januszewo, Kuyavian-Pomeranian Voivodeship (north-central Poland)
Januszewo, Masovian Voivodeship (east-central Poland)
Januszewo, Środa Wielkopolska County in Greater Poland Voivodeship (west-central Poland)
Januszewo, Iława County in Warmian-Masurian Voivodeship (north Poland)
Januszewo, Olsztyn County in Warmian-Masurian Voivodeship (north Poland)